Shane O'Neill (born 1 March 1986) is an Irish hurler who plays as a right corner-back for the Cork senior team.

Born in Bishopstown, Cork, O'Neill first played competitive hurling whilst at school in Coláiste an Spioraid Naoimh. He arrived on the inter-county scene at the age of seventeen when he first linked up with the Cork minor team, before later joining the under-21 side. He joined the senior team as a member of the extended panel during the 2005 championship. Since then O'Neill has become a regular member of the starting fifteen and has won one Munster medal on the field of play. He has been an All-Ireland runner-up on one occasion.

As a member of the Munster inter-provincial team, O'Neill has won one Railway Cup medal. At club level he has won several championship medals in all grades with Bishopstown.

Playing career

Club

O'Neill was a beneficiary of the under-age hurling boom with Bishopstown between 2003 and 2007. Back-to-back minor championship medals in 2003 and 2004 were followed by back-to-back under-21 championship medals in 2006 and 2007.

In 2006 O'Neill was a key member of Bishopstown's top team that faced Carrigtwohill in the final of the premier intermediate championship. A 0-20 to 1-11 victory gave him a Cork Premier Intermediate Hurling Championship medal.

Inter-county

O'Neill first lined out with Cork in the minor grade in 2003. A disappointing season followed, however, in 2004 he won his first Munster medal as Cork ended Tipperary's hopes of four-in-a-row with a 2-13 to 3-8 victory.

The following year O'Neill was a key member of the Cork under-21 team. He won a Munster medal in his debut year, as Cork defeated old rivals Tipperary by 4-8 to 0-13.

Two years later and O'Neill was appointed captain of the Cork under-21 team. He won a second Munster medal on that occasion following a 1-20 to 0-10 trouncing of Waterford.

By 2005 O'Neill's performances for the Cork minor and under-21 teams brought him to the attention of the senior selectors. He was a member of the extended panel during Cork's All-Ireland victory. He won a Munster medal in 2006 as an unused substitute.

On 17 June 2007 O'Neill made his senior championship debut in a 5-15 to 3-18 Munster semi-final defeat by Waterford. The following few seasons saw Cork go into decline, however, a highlight for O'Neill was being appointed captain of the team in 2011.

O'Neill lined out in his second Munster decider in 2013, however, Cork faced a 0-24 to 0-15 defeat by Limerick. On 8 September 2013 he lined out against Clare in his first All-Ireland final. Three second-half goals through Conor Lehane, Anthony Nash and Pa Cronin, and a tenth point of the game from Patrick Horgan gave Cork a one-point lead as injury time came to an end. A last-gasp point from corner-back Domhnall O'Donovan earned Clare a 0-25 to 3-16 draw. The replay on 28 September was regarded as one of the best in recent years. Clare's Shane O'Donnell was a late addition to the team, and went on to score a hat-trick of goals in the first nineteen minutes of the game. Patrick Horgan top scored for Cork, however, further goals from Conor McGrath and Darach Honan secured a 5-16 to 3-16 victory for Clare.

In 2014 O'Neill won his first Munster medal on the field of play as goals by Séamus Harnedy and Paudie O'Sullivan gave Cork a 2-24 to 0-24 victory over Limerick.

Inter-provincial

O'Neill also had the honour of being picked for Munster in the inter-provincial series of games. He won an Interprovincial Championship medal in 2013 as Munster defeated Connacht by 1-22 to 0-15.

Honours

Bishopstown
Cork Premier Intermediate Hurling Championship (1): 2006
Cork Under-21 Hurling Championship (2): 2006, 2007
Cork Minor Hurling Championship (2): 2003, 2004

Cork
All-Ireland Senior Hurling Championship (1): 2005 (sub)
Munster Senior Hurling Championship (2): 2006 (sub), 2014
Munster Under-21 Hurling Championship (2): 2005, 2007
Munster Minor Hurling Championship (1): 2004

Munster
Railway Cup (1): 2013

References

1986 births
Living people
Bishopstown hurlers
Cork inter-county hurlers
Munster inter-provincial hurlers
Hurling backs